Frieleia is a genus of brachiopods belonging to the family Frieleiidae.

The species of this genus are found in Northern America.

Species:

Frieleia halli 
Frieleia pellucida

References

Brachiopod genera